Tähtivaeltaja (literally stellar wanderer) is a Finnish quarterly science fiction magazine published in Finland.

History and profile
Tähtivaeltaja was started in 1982. The magazine is published by Helsingin science fiction -seura. Toni Jerrman has been the editor of the magazine throughout its twenty-year history. Contributors to the magazine have included Johanna Sinisalo, Jyrki Kasvi, Petri Hiltunen and Jyrki 69, among others.

See also

 Tähtivaeltaja Award
 Tähtifantasia Award

References

External links
 Official website 
 WorldCat record

1982 establishments in Finland
Finnish-language magazines
Magazines established in 1982
Magazines published in Helsinki
Science fiction magazines
Science fiction magazines established in the 1980s
Quarterly magazines published in Finland

fr:Prix Tähtivaeltaja